Mazzetti is an Italian surname.

List of people with the surname Mazzetti
 Annamaria Mazzetti, an Italian triathlete
 Germana Mazzetti, birth name of Italian singer  Germana Caroli
 Mark Mazzetti, an American journalist with The New York Times
 Pilar Mazzetti, a Peruvian doctor and Minister of the Interior
 Tim Mazzetti, a former National Football League placekicker